The Men Who Built America (also known as The Innovators: The Men Who Built America in some international markets) is an eight-hour, four-part miniseries docudrama which was originally broadcast on the History Channel in autumn 2012, and on the History Channel UK in fall 2013. The series focuses on the lives of Cornelius Vanderbilt, John D. Rockefeller, Andrew Carnegie, J. P. Morgan, and Henry Ford. It tells how their industrial innovations and business empires revolutionized modern society. The series is directed by Patrick Reams and Ruán Magan and is narrated by Campbell Scott. It averaged 2.6 million total viewers (1.2 million adults 25–54 and 1 million adults 18–49) across four nights.

Cast
In alphabetical order:
 William Jennings Bryan – James Kidd
 Andrew Carnegie – (The Elder) – Adam Jonas Segaller
 Andrew Carnegie – (The Younger) – AJ Achinger
 Thomas Edison – Justin Morck
 James Fisk – Kenneth Cavett
 Henry Ford – Cary Donaldson
 Henry Clay Frick – John C. Bailey
 Jay Gould – Cameron McNary
 William McKinley – Dan Odell
 J. P. Morgan – (The Elder) – Ray Reynolds          
 J. P. Morgan – (The Younger) – Eric Rolland
 Junius Spencer Morgan – Daniel Berkey
 John D. Rockefeller – Tim Getman
 Theodore Roosevelt – Joseph Wiegand              
 Charles M. Schwab – John Keabler
 Thomas A. Scott – Don Meehan
 Nikola Tesla – Alex Falberg
 Cornelius Vanderbilt – David Donahoe
 William Henry Vanderbilt – Michael Chmiel
 George Westinghouse – Einar Gunn

Episodes
Note: The series consists of eight one-hour episodes; for TV they were combined into four two-hour episodes.

Reception
Neil Genzlinger from The New York Times observed that the series did not contain startling revelations about its principal subjects, although certainly gave them a modern-day relevance.

Linda Holmes writing for NPR ridiculed the series for dull presentation, corny re-enactments and ineffective narration. She criticized the production for feeling "a lot like a tricked-out version of an elementary school filmstrip" and suggested that the series might be popular among those who accepted Donald Trump as one of the experts.

Geoff Berkshire from Variety criticized the series for "overblown recreations backed by bombastic music, combined with  tepid performances by the re-enactors and rudimentary writing". Mentioning the series' "ostentatious style [that] begins to grate within the first 30 minutes", he scorned "the talking heads [that] simply feel like filler" and the particular style of padding out the runtime when "the viewers are subjected to the customary recap of the previous segment after every ad break." He concluded that unlike the game-changing icons it intended to celebrate, the series failed to leave its mark.

Verne Gay from Newsday gave the series "C" grade for "self-serving, obvious or of the fortune cookie variety" tips dispensed by the guests and for the lack of subtlety and historic context. On another hand, he praised the well-produced, although often static, recreations.

On Metacritic the series has a score of 60 out of 100, based on 4 critics, indicating "mixed or average reviews".

Home media release
The miniseries has been released by The History Channel on January 22, 2013, in a three-disc set in both DVD and Blu-ray Disc formats.

References

External links
 The Men Who Built America at the History Channel official website
 

2012 American television series debuts
History (American TV channel) original programming
2010s American drama television miniseries
Television series about the history of the United States
American television docudramas
Cultural depictions of Thomas Edison